Doris Kareva (28 November 1958) is an Estonian poet and translator. She serves as the head of the Estonian National Commission in UNESCO.

Biography
Kareva was born in Tallinn. Her father, Hillar Kareva, was a notable composer. She studied English language and literature at the University of Tartu and started to write poetry in the 1960s. She is a recipient of a number of state awards, including two Estonian State Cultural Awards and the Order of the White Star.

Kareva's poetry was translated to 18 languages as of 2014. She translated to Estonian, among other authors, William Shakespeare, Anna Akhmatova, Emily Dickinson, Joseph Brodsky, Kahlil Gibran, Kabir, W. H. Auden, and Samuel Beckett.

Selected works
Poetry books
 Päevapildid (1978)
 Ööpildid (1980)
 Puudutus (1981)
 Salateadvus (1983)
 Vari ja viiv (1986)
 Armuaeg (1991)
 Kuuhobune (1992)
 Maailma asemel (1992)
 Hingring (1997)
 Mandragora (2002)
 Aja kuju (2005)
 Tähendused (2007)
 Lõige (2007)
 Deka (2008)
 Sa pole üksi (2011)
 Perekonnaalbum (2015)

References

1958 births
Living people
Estonian women poets
Estonian translators
Translators to Estonian
Writers from Tallinn
20th-century Estonian poets
21st-century Estonian poets
20th-century Estonian women writers
21st-century Estonian women writers
20th-century translators
21st-century translators
Recipients of the Order of the White Star, 4th Class